Alfred Egan (3 April 1910 – 21 January 1962) was an Australian rules footballer who played with Carlton and North Melbourne in the Victorian Football League (VFL).

Family
The son of Edward Egan, and Margaret Egan, née Farrell, Alfred George Egan was born into the Gunditjmara indigenous community at Wallacedale, near Condah, in Western Victoria, on 3 April 1910.

Although his brother, Allan Edmund Egan (1914–1951), was cleared from "Melbourne Boys" to the North Melbourne Seconds in 1937, he did not play any senior VFL football.

He married Gweneth May Cavenagh in 1950.

Football
Egan was the first Indigenous Australian to play for Carlton and also the first to play with North Melbourne.

He appeared as a centre half-forward in the 1932 VFL Grand Final, as a replacement for an injured Jack Green, but wasn't able to steer his side to a win.

Death
He died at Burnley, Victoria on 21 January 1962.

See also
Gunditjmara of note

Notes

References
 
 De Bolfo, Tony, "How Alf Egan led the way", Carlton Media, carltonfc.com.au, Monday, 14 July 2014.

External links
 
 
 Alf Egan, at Blueseum.

1910 births
1962 deaths
Australian rules footballers from Victoria (Australia)
Australian Rules footballers: place kick exponents
Carlton Football Club players
North Melbourne Football Club players
Indigenous Australian players of Australian rules football